Louis Joseph Coralie (1912–1967) was a Mauritian politician.

Participation at 1953 and 1959 elections
He stood as a candidate in the 1953 Mauritius Legislative Council elections in Grand Port-Savanne but was defeated by Sookdeo Bissoondoyal, Goinsamy Venkatasamy and Louis Philippe Rozemont. 

At the 1959 Mauritius Legislative Council elections Louis Joseph Coralie was a candidate at Constituency No.4 Port-Louis Central, at the time when there were 40 constituencies on the island. But only Abdul H.G.M. Issac was elected, defeating rivals Abdool Joomye, Monaff Fakira, Goumade Venchard and Louis Joseph Coralie.

Newspaper L'Épée
In 1954, Louis Joseph Coralie founded the political newspaper L'Epée. The newspaper bought its support to a prolonged anti-Hindu campaign in Mauritius between 1954 and 1962. Joseph Coralie was an ally of the Ralliement Mauricien (now known as PMSD) led by Jules Koenig.

Controversies
On 25 April 1956, Coralie was found guilty of slander and was ordered to pay a considerable fine to Teeluckparsad Callychurn, director of the Mauritius Post Office.

In 1958, Louis Joseph Coralie invented an 'electric' riding crop. Coralie, a member of the Mauritius Turf Club, was later arrested and imprisoned for using the electric riding crop in order to win races. Coralie was also wanted for conspiracy, but managed to evade prosecution. He was married to Marie Eliane Choyen with whom he had five children. Louis Joseph Coralie died in the United Kingdom in 1967.

References

Mauritian politicians
20th-century Mauritian writers
Mauritian businesspeople
Parti Mauricien Social Démocrate politicians
1967 deaths
1912 births
British Mauritius people
20th-century businesspeople
Mauritian Creoles